Jack Donohue may refer to:

Jack Donohue (basketball) (1933–2003), Canadian basketball coach
Jack Donohue (director) (1908–1984), American film director
Molly Maguires's member, John "Yellow Jack" Donahue
Jack Donohue Public School, named after the basketball coach

See also 
John Donoghue (disambiguation)
John Donahue (disambiguation)